Faidi al-Alami (Arabic: فيضي العلمي) was Mayor of Jerusalem from 1906 to 1909. In 1914, he was chosen to represent the city in the Ottoman parliament. His father, Musa al-Alami, was also a mayor of the city

His son, another Musa al-Alami, was assistant attorney-general of Palestine under the British mandate.

References

See also
Sharafat, East Jerusalem

Arabs in Ottoman Palestine
Palestinian politicians
Mayors of Jerusalem
20th-century Palestinian people